Taphrina ulmi is a species of fungus in the family Taphrinaceae. A plant pathogen, it causes leaf blister galls on elm (Ulmus sp.) trees.

References 

Fungal tree pathogens and diseases
Taphrinomycetes
Fungi described in 1874